Desulfurella  is a lithoautotrophic bacteria genus from the family of Desulfobacteraceae.

References

Further reading 
 
 
 
 

Campylobacterota
Bacteria genera